Masoud Poormohamad Jafar (born March 14, 1989, in Astaneh, is a goalkeeper who currently plays for Rahian Kermanshah.

Career

Played for Malavan before joining Rahian Kermanshah.

References

1989 births
Living people
Iranian footballers
Sportspeople from Gilan province
Association football goalkeepers
Paykan F.C. players
Malavan players